Nara Rohit (born 25 July 1984) is an Indian actor and producer works in Telugu films. An alumnus of New York Film Academy, Rohit is known for works such as Baanam (2009), Solo (2011), Prathinidhi (2014), Rowdy Fellow (2014), Asura (2015) and Jyo Achyutananda (2016). He owns the production house Aran Media Works.

Early life
Nara Rohit is the son of Nara Ramamurthy Naidu, the brother of N. Chandrababu Naidu, the former chief minister of Andhra Pradesh. He did his schooling in Hyderabad and Intermediate in Vignan College at Vadlamudi. He did his B.Tech. in Industrial Bio Technology at Anna University, Chennai. He then did a course in acting from New York Film Academy, New York and film making course in Los Angeles.

Career 
Rohit made his acting debut with Baanam, directed by first time director Chaitanya Dantuluri, which was released on 16 September 2009. The film was critically acclaimed. He got moderate success with his second film Solo, which was released on 25 November 2011 and directed by Parasuram. In 2012, he did a special role in Ravi Teja's Sarocharu.

In 2013, he worked with director Srinivas Raga on Okkadine, co-starring Nithya Menon. The film was not successful at the box office. He was the narrator for the film Swamy Ra Ra, starring Nikhil Siddharth and Swati Reddy.

On the eve of Rohit's birthday, the movie Balakrishnudus motion poster was released, which featured him in a toned body. Shutting out all the body shaming comments against him, the actor revealed his fit and healthy transformed body. The poster received a positive response. A great support and encouragement from director Pavan Mallela helped him to put off weight – quoted the actor in an interview with TV9.

Filmography

References

External links
 

Living people
Anna University alumni
New York Film Academy alumni
Male actors in Telugu cinema
Indian male film actors
21st-century Indian male actors
Male actors from Andhra Pradesh
People from Tirupati
Telugu film producers
Film producers from Andhra Pradesh
1984 births
Telugu male actors